Johnny Nevin is a former dual player from County Carlow, Ireland. He played Gaelic football and hurling with Carlow between the late 1980s and the 2000s.

Nevin won an All-Ireland B Football medal in 1994  He competed in the Railway Cup in both football and hurling with Leinster. He played well over 100 games with both teams. Including hurling and football, Cork is the only county Nevin has not played against competitively at senior level.

In recent years, Nevin has gone into riding. He has been involved in many teams such as Naomh Bríd, Old Leighlin, and Carlow juvenile hurling and football teams respectively. He has been very successful in the development of juvenile hurling and football in Carlow.

References

External links
 http://www.hoganstand.com/Carlow/ArticleForm.aspx?ID=40952

Year of birth missing (living people)
Living people
Dual players
Carlow inter-county Gaelic footballers
Old Leighlin Gaelic footballers
Carlow inter-county hurlers
Naomh Brid hurlers